The pars tuberalis is part of the anterior lobe of the pituitary gland, and wraps the pituitary stalk in a highly vascularized sheath.

Histology
Principal cells of the pars tuberalis are low columnar in form, with the cytoplasm containing numerous lipid droplets, glycogen granules, and occasional colloid droplets. A sparse population of functional gonadotrophs are present (indicated by immunoreactivity for ACTH, FSH, and LH).

References

It is an extension of the pars distalis up and around infundibulum.

External links
 
 
 Slide at pitt.edu

Endocrine system